Hand to Hand is an album by the American jazz saxophonist George Adams and drummer Dannie Richmond recorded in 1980 and released on the Italian Soul Note label.

Reception
The Allmusic review awarded the album 2½ stars. The Penguin Guide to Jazz awarded the album 3 stars, stating: "Hand to Hand was another co-led session, cementing what was to be another important association, with Mingus's favourite drummer, Dannie Richmond ".

Track listing
 "The Cloocker" (Hugh Lawson) - 9:08 
 "Yamani's Passion" (George Adams) - 10:55 
 "For Dee J." (Dannie Richmond) - 8:07 
 "Joobubie" (Hugh Lawson) - 11:20
Recorded at Barigozzi Studio in Milano, Italy on February 13 & 14, 1980

Personnel
George Adams – tenor saxophone, flute
Dannie Richmond – drums
Jimmy Knepper - trombone
Hugh Lawson – piano
Mike Richmond – bass

References

Black Saint/Soul Note albums
Dannie Richmond albums
George Adams (musician) albums
1980 albums